Gyeongbuk Provincial College is the only provincial college in Daegu and Gyeongbuk. The predecessor of Gyeongbuk Provincial College is Yecheon Junior College, established in 1997. At the time of its establishment, the university consisted of eight departments, both in the automotive and civil engineering fields. 
Yecheon Junior College changed its name to Gyeong Province College in 1998. In 2008, Gyeong Province College changed its name to Gyeongbuk Provincial College.

See also
List of national universities in South Korea
List of universities and colleges in South Korea
Education in Korea

References

External links
 Official website
 Official website

See also
List of universities and colleges in South Korea

Universities and colleges in North Gyeongsang Province
1997 establishments in South Korea
Yecheon County
Public universities and colleges in South Korea